Luan Carlos Neto (born 21 May 1992), known as Luan Carlos, is a Brazilian football manager, currently in charge of Brasiliense.

Career
Born in Ipameri, Goiás, Luan Carlos played youth football for hometown side Novo Horizonte, but retired at the age of 15 due to a knee injury. He then turned into coaching, finishing his Physical Education graduation in 2012 before reaching the age of 20 and returning to Novo Horizonte in 2014, as a fitness coach.

Luan Carlos was an interim manager of Novo Horizonte for two matches in the 2015 Campeonato Goiano - Segunda Divisão, and was named permanent manager of the side in August 2016, in the place of Wladimir Araújo. On 26 April 2017, he was appointed manager of Grêmio Anápolis, but returned to Novo Horizonte in July.

On 16 December 2017, Luan Carlos was named in charge of Uniclinic, and led the side to the third place of the 2018 Campeonato Cearense. He subsequently rejoined Novo Horizonte and led the side to the first division of the Campeonato Goiano after a ten-year absence.

Announced back at Uniclinic for the 2019 season, as the club was now named Atlético Cearense, Luan Carlos left on 25 June to take over Floresta, but was sacked on 28 January 2020. On 3 February 2020, he was announced at Caucaia, but resigned ten days later after alleging personal reasons.

On 9 March 2020, Luan Carlos returned to his native state after being named at the helm of Goianésia. Dismissed on 28 March 2021, he moved to Brusque on 27 April as Jerson Testoni's assistant.

On 17 August 2021, Luan Carlos was appointed manager of Série D side Brasiliense. He left on a mutual agreement on 7 November, and was named in charge of Camboriú eighteen days later.

Luan Carlos led Camboriú to their best-ever position in the 2022 Campeonato Catarinense, losing the finals to Brusque. He was appointed Caxias manager on 3 April 2022, but left the club on 16 May to return to Brusque, now as manager. He was sacked by the latter club on 31 August.

Personal life
Luan Carlos is the son of Paulo Marcos, a former footballer and manager who notably represented Internacional. He only knew his father at the age of 16.

References

External links
 Futebol de Goyaz 
 

1992 births
Living people
Sportspeople from Goiás
Brazilian football managers
Campeonato Brasileiro Série B managers
Campeonato Brasileiro Série D managers
Grêmio Esportivo Anápolis managers
FC Atlético Cearense managers
Floresta Esporte Clube managers
Caucaia Esporte Clube managers
Goianésia Esporte Clube managers
Brasiliense Futebol Clube managers
Camboriú Futebol Clube managers
Sociedade Esportiva e Recreativa Caxias do Sul managers
Brusque Futebol Clube managers